Trichophysetis poliochyta is a moth in the family Crambidae. It is found in Australia, where it has been recorded from Queensland.

References

Cybalomiinae
Moths described in 1911
Moths of Australia